The 2015 Nigerian Senate election in Kwara State was held on March 28, 2015, to elect members of the Nigerian Senate to represent Kwara State. Mohammed Shaaba Lafiagi representing Kwara North, Bukola Saraki representing Kwara Central and Rafiu Adebayo Ibrahim representing Kwara South all won on the platform of All Progressives Congress.

Overview

Summary

Results

Kwara North 
All Progressives Congress candidate Mohammed Shaaba Lafiagi won the election, defeating People's Democratic Party candidate Yahaya Yinusa and other party candidates.

Kwara Central 
All Progressives Congress candidate Bukola Saraki won the election, defeating People's Democratic Party candidate AbdulRahman AbdulRazaq and other party candidates.

Kwara South 
All Progressives Congress candidate Rafiu Adebayo Ibrahim won the election, defeating People's Democratic Party candidate Lola Ashiru and other party candidates.

References 

Kwara State Senate elections
March 2015 events in Nigeria